Bradynotes is a genus of spur-throated grasshoppers in the family Acrididae. There is at least one described species in Bradynotes, B. obesa, also known as the "slow mountain grasshopper" and "mountain lubber grasshopper". It is found in North America, in the western United States and northwestern Mexico.

There are six subspecies of Bradynotes obesa:
 Bradynotes obesa caurus Scudder, 1897
 Bradynotes obesa deplanata Hebard, 1919
 Bradynotes obesa kaibab Hebard, 1919
 Bradynotes obesa obesa (Thomas, 1872)
 Bradynotes obesa opima Scudder, 1880
 Bradynotes obesa referta Scudder, 1897

References

Further reading

External links

 

Melanoplinae